Urban S is an electric motorcycle made by Evoke Motorcycles and is Evoke's first production model to be sold worldwide

The Urban S has been on sale in China since summer 2015 and is scheduled for release in selected European countries early 2018. Due to the 100% electric drivetrain of the bike, it is exempt from the strict licensing requirements for gasoline-powered motorbikes in the larger metropolitan areas such as Shanghai and Beijing. The European version of the Urban S will have CBS in order to meet the EEC type approval legislation.

Battery 
The batteries have a predicted lifespan of  before reaching a charging capacity of 80% but can still be used after this point with a reduced range.

The Urban S can be charged fully using either 240V for 4 hours or 120V for 8 hours.

Licence Class 
The Urban S comes under the 125cc classification in Europe so can therefore be ridden on an A1 license or a CBT in the UK

Drivetrain 

It uses a 400A DC wave controller with regenerative braking to increase efficiency.

The electric motor is a 19kW 17" high output hub motor. It is air cooled and brushless. The hub design allows better cooling, a decreased chance of overheating/warping the casing and increases the life span of the unit.

External links 
 Official Website

References 

Electric motorcycles